The Felix The Cat Cartoon Toolbox was developed and published by Big Top Productions, Inc. and released in 1994. This CD-ROM application allowed people to create their own Saturday morning cartoons. The software was developed by Big Top and the character Felix the Cat was licensed from Felix the Cat Productions. The characters were based on the 1950s version of Felix with The Professor, Rock Bottom, Poindexter, Master Cylinder and Vavoom. The software's underlying engine as later refitted for The Simpsons: Cartoon Studio in 1996.

External links
 Big Top's Cartoon Toolbox

Felix the Cat
Filmmaking video games